Joey Allcorn (born Donald Joseph Allcorn; November 3, 1980) is a country music singer/songwriter known for his own brand of traditional honky-tonk-style country music and writing many of his own songs. He has recorded three studio albums, 50 Years Too Late (2006) and All Alone Again (2009), both having been released on his Blue Yodel Records label, and one, Nothing Left To Prove, set to be released in 2014. He cites Hank Williams Sr., Ernest Tubb, Faron Young, Lefty Frizzell, and Jimmie Rodgers among his idols and modern-day influences include BR549, Wayne Hancock, Robbie Fulks and Dale Watson.

Early life
Joey Allcorn was born in Columbus, Georgia. Growing up an only child, Joey listened primarily to mainstream country music of the time until the early 1990s when bands like Nirvana and Alice In Chains became popular. He was first exposed to traditional country music at the age of 14 by his mother after she purchased a Hank Williams Greatest Hits CD. Inspired by Williams music, Joey began writing his own songs and learning to play guitar.

At the age of 17, Allcorn entered a regional amateur talent show held in his hometown of Columbus, Georgia and won first place with his performance of Hank Williams' "Long Gone Lonesome Blues." His professional career in music began right out of high school when he began performing on a package show known as the "J.B. Slicker Show." The show featured several country performers as well as comedy from comedian J.B. Slicker. The show was a part of the featured entertainment on many small fairs and festivals all over the southeast. When not performing with the J.B. Slicker show, Allcorn could be found most weekends performing for tips at the Hank Williams Museum in Montgomery, Alabama at its original location inside Montgomery Union Station. Shortly thereafter, Allcorn branched out and began performing in small clubs and other venues across Georgia and Alabama.

50 Years Too Late (2006)
Allcorn's debut album, "50 Years Too Late," was released on October 6, 2006.

Capitol Hill Testimony (2007)
On June 28, 2007, Allcorn appeared before the United States House Committee on Small Business, arguing against federal royalty increases on internet radio stations.  Allcorn presented himself as a niche market performer whose success depended, in large part, on his music's online accessibility.

All Alone Again (2009)
Allcorn's second album, "All Alone Again," was released in July 2009. The album featured 13 tracks written by Allcorn and features musicians Dave Roe on bass, Johnny Hiland and Chris Scruggs on lead guitar, Hank Singer on fiddle, Lloyd Green on steel guitar. It would also be one of the final records legendary steel guitar player Don Helms would appear on. The album was the first released on Allcorn's own, independent Blue Yodel label and was received well by fans and press alike;

"All Alone Again, is an authentic reflection of who Joey Allcorn is as a songwriter and as a performer. Instead of making an album with an "underground scene" in mind, he instead made the wise decision to make a record with himself in mind. The result is a cohesive, polished product that reflects not the artist that Allcorn wants to be, but the artist that he is. The album borrows heavily from tradition, but does so in an honest way that makes it accessible to today's listeners that crave that timeless blend of authenticity, fiddle, and steel."

Nothing Left To Prove (2014)
"Nothing Left To Prove," Allcorn's third album, was a digital only release in the fall of 2014. The album featured the same staff of musicians as "All Alone Again" with the additions of Sol Philcox on lead guitar and Eddy Dunlap on steel guitar. Col. J.D. Wilkes from Th' Legendary Shack Shakers makes an appearance with his harmonica on the song "South Montgomery Blues" and Sturgill Simpson adds backing vocals on "Just Barely Gettin' By." Like the previous two releases, "Nothing Left To Prove" was well received by fans and press alike;

"Where some of the neo-traditionalists came and went from the sound of the movement, Allcorn remains firmly ensconced in the style, with very traditional modes and styles marking his songs, yet with a little extra crunch in the lead guitar thrown in there at times just to let you know this is old music, but from the new generation."

This album was released on CD for the first time on September 29, 2020.

Discography
Studio albums
 50 Years Too Late (2006)
 All Alone Again (2009)
 Nothing Left To Prove (2014)
 State of Heartbreak (EP) (2020)

Other appearances
 "The United State Of Americana, Vol. 2" (Shut Eye Records, 2005) (Contributing Track: "I Just Don't Know")
 "Outlaw Radio Chicago Compilation, Vol. I (Solitary Records, 2010) (Contributing Track: "Gone But Not Forgotten Blues")
 "Southern Independent Vol. II (Black Country Rock, 2011) (Contributing Track: "Whatever Kills Me First")
 "Outlaw Radio Chicago Compilation, Vol. II (Solitary Records, 2012) (Contributing Track: "Sad Songs And Waltzes")
 "River Town Rock House" (Razor Point Records, 2012) (Contributing Tracks: "Son of a Ramblin' Man" and "Down in Lousianne")
 "Long Gone Daddy" (Hank Williams III, Curb Records, 2012) (Contributing Track: "This Ain't Montgomery")
 "Ashes & Angels" (Fifth on the Floor, eOne Entertainment, 2013) (Vocals on "Same Old Thing")
 "Midnight: The Death Of Hank Williams" (Various Artists, 2013) (Vocals on "Midnight", "The Death Of Hank Williams", "Death Is Only A Dream" & "Are You Sure Hank Done It This Way")

References

External links 
 Official Website
 Video of Joey Allcorn's testimony before the House Committee on Small Business, 28 June 2007

1980 births
Living people
Musicians from Columbus, Georgia
American alternative country singers
American country singer-songwriters
American male singer-songwriters
Country musicians from Georgia (U.S. state)
21st-century American male singers
21st-century American singers
Singer-songwriters from Georgia (U.S. state)